Shreemanthana Magalu or Shrimanthana Magalu (Kannada:ಶ್ರೀಮಂತನ ಮಗಳು, English: Aristocrat's Dsaughter) is a 1977 Kannada film, directed by A. V. Sheshagiri Rao, starring actors Vishnuvardhan and Jayanthi.

Jayanthi actress in lead role supported by vishnuvardhan, dwarkish

Cast

 Vishnuvardhan
 Jayanthi
 Udaya Kumar
 Vajramuni
 Chandra Shekhar
 K. S. Ashwath
 Balakrishna
 Dwarakish
 Prabhakar
 Dr. Sampath Kumar
 Joker Shyam
 G. N. Swamy
 Jr. Shetty
 Guggu
 Kannada Raju
 Mahadevappa
 Jayalakshmi
 B. Jayashree
 Meena Babu
 Jasmini
 Kairunnisa

Soundtrack
 "Kannugalu Kamalagalu" singer: S. Janaki, lyrics: Chi. Udaya Shankar
 "Mangaana Moreya Nodu" singer: S. Janaki, lyrics: Chi. Udaya Shankar
 "Hey Undadi Gunda" singer:	SPB, S. Janaki, lyrics: Chi. Udaya Shankar
 "Bandide Hosavasantha" singer: SPB, lyrics: Chi. Udaya Shankar
 "Beeso Gaali Indu" singer:	SPB, S. Janaki, lyrics: R. N. Jayagopal

References

External links
 Srimanthana Magalu at the Internet Movie Database

1977 films
1970s Kannada-language films
Films scored by G. K. Venkatesh
Films directed by A. V. Seshagiri Rao